The Beijing Lu Xun Museum is a museum in Fucheng Gate Avenue, Beijing, China. The buildings in which the museum situated at was Lu Xun's former Beijing residence.  The writer's house museum was established in 1956.  The museum is dedicated to Lu Xun's life and achievements and features large quantities of scripts, photos, pictures related to Lu. In addition to materials related to Lu Xun, the museum contains a large collection of artworks.

Books

Art

See also
 Former Residence of Lu Xun (Shanghai)
 Lu Xun Native Place
 List of museums in China

References 

Museums in Beijing
Biographical museums in China
Literary museums in China
Beijing
Lu Xun
Major National Historical and Cultural Sites in Beijing
National first-grade museums of China
Historic house museums in China